Namat (or Potaia) is a Yam language spoken in Western Province, Papua New Guinea.

References

Nambu languages
Languages of Western Province (Papua New Guinea)